Gebhard (Gebhart) is a German given name, recorded at least from the 9th century.
It is composed of the Old High German elements geb "gift" and hard "brave, hardy".

People with the surname  
Heinrich Gebhard (1878–1963), pianist, composer and teacher
Fran Gebhard, Canadian theatre director and actor
Renate Gebhard (born 1977), Italian jurist and politician
Rollo Gebhard (1921–2013), German sailor and writer

Given and/or ceremonial names  

Gebhard, Duke of Lorraine (888–910), Frankish noble
Gebhard of Constance (949–995), Austrian bishop and saint
Gebhard I (Bishop of Regensburg) (died 1023) 
Gebhard II (Bishop of Regensburg) (died 1036) 
Gebhard III (Bishop of Regensburg) (died 1060) 
Gebhard of Salzburg (about 1010–1088), Archbishop there, from 1060

See also
Gephardt

German masculine given names